St Monica's College is a Catholic co-educational secondary school which was established in 1964. Located across two main campuses, it is situated just north of Melbourne, Australia in the suburb of Epping. The College also includes a small country campus in Strath Creek which is used as a retreat and by visiting class groups. The College is a member of the Sports Association of Catholic Co-educational Secondary Schools (SACCSS).

History
St Monica's College, Epping, originally commenced its operations as an annexe to St Peter's Primary School in 1964 under the auspices of the Sisters of the Good Samaritan. A growing population in the area made it clear that a fully functioning secondary school would soon be needed and the College at Epping was planned and building commenced in 1966.

The name, St Monica's, was bestowed on the College by Archbishop Simonds in 1966 but it was not until February 1967 that the completed buildings in Davisson Street were officially blessed and opened by Bishop Moran.

Principals
Between 1965 and 1989 the schools principals were all members of a Catholic order of nuns known as the Sisters of the Good Samaritan or S.G.S. In 1990 a lay principal was appointed for the first time.

Principal's Dinner
The school holds an annual Principal's Dinner about halfway through the school year, a celebration and gathering for students, their parents (or guardians), and staff. The school has received criticism for insisting that students with a deceased or unavailable parent may not use their tickets for a sibling or other member of their support network.

Facilities
The College utilises a wide range of modern facilities across two main campuses.

Davisson Street Campus
This is the senior campus and administration centre for the College. It also counts with an IT centre, science labs, visual and performing arts facilities, a library, chapel, gymnasium, and sports fields, among other facilities.

Dalton Road Campus
This is the junior campus and it is located a short distance away. The campus provides open areas which service the curriculum, sport and performing arts requirements. Facilities in this campus include a library, science and computer labs, the Lorraine Pratt Sports Fields, an arts wing, a chapel, a  food technology centre, a music centre, and the wetlands, among others.

Ostia
Ostia is the College's country retreat facility located at Strath Creek in country Victoria.

Sport
The school has sports facilities for Australian rules football, Volleyball, athletics, swimming, cross country running, Basketball, tennis, golf and Futsal.

Extra-curricular programs
The school provides extra-curricular programs such as the Good Samaritan Inn program.

Notable alumni 
 Simon Colosimo - Australian footballer
 Timothy Kyriakou - Jurist
 Reno Piscopo - Australian footballer
 Alex Sexton - Australian Football League player
 Jayden Short - Australian Football League player

References

External links
 
 Website of the Congregation of the Sisters of the Good Samaritan, Australia

Catholic secondary schools in Melbourne
Educational institutions established in 1964
1964 establishments in Australia
Buildings and structures in the City of Whittlesea